The Feel Good Record of the Year is the eighth and final studio album by punk rock band No Use for a Name. It was recorded in Fort Collins, Colorado at the Blasting Room with the producers Bill Stevenson & Jason Livermore (Descendents, Rise Against, Good Riddance, 7 Seconds).

Release
On January 20, 2008, The Feel Good Record of the Year was announced for release in three months' time, followed by the track listing three days later. In February and March 2008, the band appeared on the Fat Tour, alongside NOFX and the Flatliners. On February 25, 2008, "Biggest Lie" was posted on the band's Myspace profile, followed by "I Want to Be Wrong" on March 24, 2008. The Feel Good Record of the Year was made available for streaming on March 29, 2008 through their Myspace, before being four days later. It was promoted with a tour of Europe with support from Far from Finished. The band went on the second leg of the Fat Tour with NOFX and American Steel in May 2008. On May 23, a music video for "Biggest Lie" premiered through Fuse's website. In November 2008, the band went on a short West Coast tour with Pulley. In January and February 2009, the band went on a tour of Europe, which was followed by two shows in Israel with Useless ID. In April 2009, the band embarked on a tour of South America. Following this, they headlined the Fat Canada Tour, which lasted throughout May 2009. In October and November 2009, the band went on a tour of Asia, visiting China, Japan, Indonesia and Malaysia.

This is the final No Use for a Name studio album released before the death of frontman Tony Sly in 2012.

Track listing

Personnel
No Use for a Name
Tony Sly – Vocals, rhythm guitar 
Matt Riddle – Bass guitar, vocals
Dave Nassie – Lead guitar
Rory Koff – Drums

Artwork
Matt Schwartz – Cover Photo 
Gilles Baro – Photography

Additional musicians
Andrew Berlin – Clarinet, organ, piano
Jason Livermore – Percussion

Production
Bill Stevenson – Producer, engineer
Jason Allen – Engineer 
Jason Livermore – Mastering, audio production, engineer
Andrew Berlin – Engineer, strings

Charts
Album

References

2008 albums
No Use for a Name albums
Fat Wreck Chords albums
Albums produced by Bill Stevenson (musician)